Garbla Syedan is a village in Sialkot District, Punjab, Pakistan.

Villages in Sialkot District